Dubasov is a Russian masculine surname, its feminine counterpart is Dubasova. It may refer to
Beáta Dubasová (born 1963), Slovak singer
Fyodor Dubasov (1845–1912), Russian admiral
Ivan Dubasov (1897–1988), Russian artist
Nikolay Dubasov (1869–1935), Russian pianist and music teacher
Prokhor Dubasov (1743—1823), Russian soldier

Russian-language surnames